Nguyễn Thị Thiết (born October 27, 1984) is a Vietnamese weightlifter. She won a total of four medals (one gold and three silver) for the 63 kg class at the Southeast Asian Games (2003 in Hanoi, Vietnam, 2005 in Manila, Philippines, 2007 in Bangkok, Thailand, and 2009 in Vientiane, Laos).

Nguyen made her official debut for the 2004 Summer Olympics in Athens, where she competed for the women's middleweight class (63 kg). She finished only in sixth place by ten kilograms short of her record from South Korea's Kim Soo-Kyung, with a total of 205.0 kilograms (95 in the snatch, and 110 in the clean and jerk).

At the 2008 Summer Olympics in Beijing, Nguyen qualified for the second time in the women's 63 kg class, after finishing second from the Asian Weightlifting Championships in Kanazawa, Japan. Nguyen placed fifth in this event, as she successfully lifted 100 kg in the single-motion snatch, and hoisted 125 kg in the two-part, shoulder-to-overhead clean and jerk, for a total of 225 kg.

References

External links
 
NBC 2008 Olympics profile

1984 births
Living people
People from Hải Dương province
Olympic weightlifters of Vietnam
Weightlifters at the 2004 Summer Olympics
Weightlifters at the 2008 Summer Olympics
Weightlifters at the 2002 Asian Games
Weightlifters at the 2006 Asian Games
Vietnamese female weightlifters
Southeast Asian Games gold medalists for Vietnam
Southeast Asian Games silver medalists for Vietnam
Southeast Asian Games medalists in weightlifting
Competitors at the 2003 Southeast Asian Games
Competitors at the 2005 Southeast Asian Games
Competitors at the 2007 Southeast Asian Games
Competitors at the 2009 Southeast Asian Games
Asian Games competitors for Vietnam
21st-century Vietnamese women
20th-century Vietnamese women